HSBC Expat, formerly HSBC International, is the offshore banking arm of the HSBC Group and is wholly owned by HSBC Holdings plc.

External links 

 HSBC Bank International

References 

Expat
Companies of Jersey
Offshore finance